

Tunica molesta
A tunica molesta (Latin for "annoying shirt") was a tunic impregnated with pitch and other flammable substances such as naphtha or resin. This was put upon the victim while the neck of the victim was fixed to a stake with an iron collar. It was then ignited, burning the victim alive. 

Capital punishments commonly took place during the gladiator games in the Amphitheatre, at lunchtime, when all forms of public executions, including death by crematio, were carried out. Execution by burning was often part of a dramatic performance of Graeco-Roman mythology. Dramas that contained conflict between good and evil were seen as morally uplifting, and public executions of convicted criminals were believed to doubly improve virtue by providing a real life deterrent. By the second half of the first century, evidence for executions as public spectacle is particularly strong. Afterwards, the charred corpse was dragged by a hook throughout the arena for spectators to see. 

It is also a form of a Shirt of Flame later used in death by burning as described in Foxe's Book of Martyrs.

Origins
Homicidal violence and the blood sports that became the gladiator games have a long history. In early societies, the violence of blood sports and the sacred are linked, often occurring together in sacred contexts such as funerals. In Rome, spectacles originally put on for the funerals of important people, called munera, might have included plays, chariot races and combat sports. 

The origins of the tunica molesta are not agreed upon by scholars. Ben Hubbard believes that Nero invented the tunica molesta. This is probably not the case, since the tunica appears in literature of the centuries before Nero's reign. Thomas Wiedemann has written that, "An epigram in the Book of Spectacles refers to someone 'in matutina arena' playing the role 'Mucius Scaevola', the Roman hero who proved his bravery in the presence of the Etruscan king Lars Porsena [circa 500 BC] by thrusting his right hand into the flame; this is said to have been an alternative to the tuniuca molesta."  

Nero did execute numbers of Christians in this manner. One of the great satirists of Roman Empire was Decimus Junias Juvenalis, who tells a supporter of Nero's, Tigellinus Sophoneus, who encouraged Nero's worst passions, that he would, himself, soon "shine in that torch like tunic.

Julia Shear traces its origins to a Greek tradition. Athenians and non-Athenians celebrated their goddess in festivals now known as the Panathenian games. These celebrations included 'dancers in arms' (Gr.:pyrrhichistai) the fore-runners of gladiators.

References

Bibliography
 
 
 

Roman-era clothing
Instruments of torture
Execution methods
Execution equipment
Shirts